Florian Hoxha (born 22 February 2001) is a footballer who plays as a left-back for Swiss club Grasshoppers. Born in Switzerland, he represents Kosovo at under-21 international level.

Club career
Hoxha started playing football at FC Embrach until 2015, where he transferred to Grasshoppers and played with the U17 and U18 teams, where he was later promoted to the U21 team with whom he debuted on 17 March 2018 in a 2–2 away draw against FC Sursee after being named in the starting line-up.

On 31 July 2021, Hoxha was named as a first team substitute for the first time in a league match against Young Boys. His debut with Grasshoppers came fifteen days later in the 2021–22 Swiss Cup first round against FC Widnau after being named in the starting line-up. Six days after debut, he made his league debut in a 2–1 away defeat against Zürich after being named in the starting line-up.

International career
On 15 March 2021, Hoxha received a call-up from Kosovo U21 for the friendly matches against Qatar U23. Eleven days later, he made his debut with Kosovo U21 in first match against Qatar U23 after being named in the starting line-up.

References

External links

2001 births
Living people
People from Bülach
Footballers from Zürich
Association football fullbacks
Kosovan footballers
Kosovo under-21 international footballers
Swiss men's footballers
Swiss people of Kosovan descent
Swiss people of Albanian descent
Swiss Super League players
Grasshopper Club Zürich players